Oberfeld is a quarter in the district 6 of Winterthur. Zürich, Switzerland.

It was formerly a part of Wülflingen municipality, which was incorporated into Winterthur in 1922.

Winterthur